Orsy may refer to:

 Ladislas Orsy (born 1921), Hungarian theologian
 Jaim Orsy, character in the Foundation series
 Orsy, Warmian-Masurian Voivodeship, Poland

See also
 Orsi